The year 622 BC was a year of the pre-Julian Roman calendar. In the Roman Empire, it was known as year 132 Ab urbe condita . The denomination 622 BC for this year has been used since the early medieval period, when the Anno Domini calendar era became the prevalent method in Europe for naming years.

Births
 Ezekiel, Hebrew prophet (d. c. 570 BC)

Deaths
Viscount Cheng of Zhao

References